Knight-Swift Transportation Holdings Inc. (referred to as Knight-Swift) is a publicly traded, American motor carrier holding company based in Phoenix, Arizona. It is the fifth largest trucking company in the United States. The company's primary subsidiaries are truckload carriers Knight Transportation,  Swift Transportation, Midnite Express  and, since July 2021, less than truckload (LTL) carrier AAA Cooper. In January 2022, the company expanded its LTL footprint with the acquisition of Midwest Motor Express.

History 

Knight Transportation was founded in 1990 by four cousins: brothers, Randy and Gary Knight and brothers Kevin and Keith Knight. The four cousins worked for Swift Transportation, also based in Phoenix, and Randy was even a part-owner in Swift when Jerry Moyes bought out his interest. The Moyes family and the Knight family both were raised in Plain City, Utah, before moving to Phoenix in the late 1960s.

Knight began transporting general commodities from Phoenix, Arizona, to Los Angeles, California. Starting with just a handful of trucks and one service center in Phoenix, Arizona, the company now runs a fleet of over 4,000 trucks and more than 8,700 trailers (dry, refrigerated, and brokerage). Revenues have grown from over 13 million in 1991 to over $866 million in 2011, with operating ratios at or near 80% year after year. They have grown from a few associates to more than 4,000, and from a family-owned business to a publicly held company trading on the New York Stock Exchange (KNX) in 1994.

In 2017, Knight Transportation merged with Swift Transportation and Knight-Swift Transportation Holdings Inc. was formed to serve as the parent company for both carriers.

In 2019, Knight-Swift settled a $100 million class-action lawsuit alleging the company failed to classify 20,000 owner-operator drivers as employees. Drivers were not paid the minimum hourly wage in accordance with the Fair Labor Standards Act and had their rights violated under the forced labor statute. The lawsuit from March 11, 2009 is entitled Van Dusen, et al. v. Swift Transportation Co. of Arizona, LLC, et al.. The deadline for claimants to file was December 14, 2019.

Business 
Knight engages in the transportation of general commodities in the United States. It provides asset-based dry van truckload and temperature controlled truckload carrier services primarily to short to medium lengths of haul. The company also offers non-asset-based brokerage services. As of 2022, the company operates 41 service centers (31 in the USA, 11 in Mexico), 5 secured yards in Canada, and Swift Truckload centers in housing dry vans, flatbed, refrigerated, and cross-border services.

Knight-Swift is ranked 66th in pay for drivers among major trucking companies. In 2022, Knight-Swift announced plans for using autonomous vehicles in its trucking lines, through a partnership with Embark Technology.

References

External links 

Knight Refrigerated
Knight Brokerage
Knight Truck Sales

Companies based in Phoenix, Arizona
Companies listed on the New York Stock Exchange
Trucking companies of the United States
Transport companies established in 1990
1990 establishments in Arizona
1994 initial public offerings
Transportation companies based in Arizona